A collection of popes who have had violent deaths through the centuries. The circumstances have ranged from martyrdom (Pope Stephen I) to war (Lucius II), to a beating by a jealous husband (Pope John XII). A number of other popes have died under circumstances that some believe to be murder, but for which definitive evidence has not been found.

Martyr popes

Saint Peter, traditionally martyred by upside-down crucifixion
Pope Linus (Saint)
Pope Anacletus or Cletus (Saint)
Pope Clement I (Saint), thrown into sea with anchor around his neck
Pope Evaristus, not listed in the Roman Martyrology but executed
Pope Sixtus I (Saint)
Pope Telesphorus (Saint)
Pope Anicetus (Saint) (155–166), traditionally martyred
Pope Soter (Saint) (166–175), died a martyr 
Pope Eleuterus (Saint) (175–189), died a martyr
Pope Victor I (Saint) 189–199, died a martyr
Pope Calixtus I (Saint) (217–222), died a martyr
Pope Urban I (Saint) 222–230, died a martyr
Pope Pontian (Saint) 230–235, condemned to mines in Sardinia and died on island of Tavolara
Pope Anterus (Saint), elected 21 November 235, martyred at hands of Emperor Maximus
Pope Fabian (Saint), elected 10 January 236 and died a martyr during persecution and decapitated by Decius
Pope Cornelius (Saint), elected March 251 and died a martyr June 253
Pope Lucius I (Saint), elected 25 June 253 and martyred 5 March 254
Pope Stephen I (Saint), elected 12 May 254 and martyred 2 August 257
Pope Sixtus II (Saint), elected 30 August 257 and martyred 6 August 258
Pope Dionysius (Saint), elected 22 July 259 after year of persecutions and died 26 December 268, martyred
Pope Felix I (Saint), elected 5 January 269 and died 30 December 274, martyred
Pope Eutychian (Saint), elected 4 January 275 and martyred 7 December 283
Pope Caius (Saint), elected 17 December 283 and martyred 22 April 296 but not at hands of his uncle Diocletian
Pope Marcellinus (Saint), elected 30 June 296 and martyred 25 October 10 during persecution of Diocletian
Pope Marcellus I (Saint), elected 27 May 308 after 4-year vacancy and martyred 16 January 309
Pope Eusebius (Saint), elected 18 April 309 and martyred in Sicily 17 August 309.
Pope John I (Saint), elected August 13, 523, during the Ostrogothic occupation of the Italian peninsula. Was sent as an envoy by Ostrogoth king Theodoric the Great to Constantinople. Upon return, Theodoric accused John I of conspiracy with the Byzantine empire. Imprisoned and starved to death on 18 May 526.
Pope Martin I (Saint) Elected in 649. Died in exile 16 September 655.

Murdered popes
John VIII (872–882), allegedly poisoned and then clubbed to death
Stephen VI (896–897), strangled
Leo V (903), allegedly strangled
John X (914–928), allegedly smothered with pillow
John XII (955–964), allegedly murdered by the jealous husband of the woman with whom he was in bed
Benedict VI (973–974), strangled
John XIV (983–984), died either by starvation, ill-treatment or direct murder

Dubious

Pope Alexander I (Saint), recognition as the martyred Saint Alexander (feast day May 3) rescinded in 1960
Pope Hyginus (Saint), martyrdom
Pope Pius I (Saint), martyred by the sword according to old sources. Claim of martyrdom removed from the 1969 General Roman Calendar after recent revisions.
Clement II (1046–1047), allegedly poisoned
Celestine V (1294–1296), allegedly murdered while in post-abdication captivity. Allegations blame his successor, Pope Boniface VIII.
Boniface VIII (1294–1303), allegedly (though unlikely) died from the effects of ill-treatment one month before.

See also

Lists
List of canonised popes
List of popes
List of popes by length of reign
List of popes from the Borgia family
List of popes from the Conti family
List of popes from the Medici family
List of popes sorted alphabetically
List of Sovereigns of the Vatican City State

Related topics
Annuario Pontificio
Attempted assassination of Pope John Paul II
History of the papacy
Index of Vatican City-related articles
Legends surrounding the papacy
Liber Pontificalis
Pope John Paul I conspiracy theories
Prophecy of the Popes

References

Lists of people by cause of death
Lists of religious figures
Died violently

Popes